The Ocumare de la Costa de Oro Municipality is one of the 18 municipalities (municipios) that makes up the Venezuelan state of Aragua and, according to the 2011 census by the National Institute of Statistics of Venezuela, the municipality has a population of 12,816. The town of Ocumare de la Costa is the shire town of the Ocumare de la Costa de Oro Municipality.

History
Ocumare de la Costa, known for its attractive tourist beaches, hides a great history in its mountains. Today, traveling from other parts of the country to Ocumare is easy compared with previous years; one had to travel by horse and carriage through the mountains (passing through the towns of San Joaquin, El Loro, Hacienda Santa Maria, and Cumboto on the way) in order to get to Ocumare de la Costa. In 1921, the construction of today's modern highway began, and it was completed in 1927.

Demographics
The Ocumare de la Costa de Oro Municipality, according to a 2007 population estimate by the National Institute of Statistics of Venezuela, has a population of 9,605 (up from 8,239 in 2000). This amounts to 0.6% of the state's population.

Government
The mayor of the Ocumare de la Costa de Oro Municipality is Roberto José Madero, re-elected on October 31, 2004, with 40% of the vote.  The municipality is divided into one parish; Capital Ocumare de La Costa de Oro.

See also
Ocumare de la Costa
Aragua
Municipalities of Venezuela

References

External links
ocumare-aragua.gob.ve 

Municipalities of Aragua